Miljenko Kovačić (19 March 1973 – 20 August 2005) was a Croatian football player. His nickname was "The Son of the Wind".

Club career
He played professionally for quite a few teams, most notably for Dinamo Zagreb with which he was part of the national championship victory in 1995–1996 and Brescia (Italy). Certain choices he made in his professional career were interesting, at one point he quit playing because of religious reasons (he was a member of the Hare Krishna religion) stating money being the root of evil and that he was content with what he had. This was a shock to his employer at the time, the professional Italian team Brescia. Kovačić did return to professional soccer briefly in 2001, but quit again in 2005 due to family reasons.

Death
He lost his life in a motorcycle accident in 2005.

References

External links
 

1973 births
2005 deaths
Footballers from Zagreb
Association football forwards
Croatian footballers
GNK Dinamo Zagreb players
Brescia Calcio players
NK Vrbovec players
NK Slaven Belupo players
Hapoel Petah Tikva F.C. players
Croatian Football League players
Serie A players
Serie B players
Israeli Premier League players
Croatian expatriate footballers
Expatriate footballers in Italy
Croatian expatriate sportspeople in Italy
Expatriate footballers in Israel
Croatian expatriate sportspeople in Israel
Road incident deaths in Croatia
Motorcycle road incident deaths